The Watermill Theatre is a repertory theatre in Bagnor, Berkshire. It opened in 1967 in Bagnor Mill, a converted watermill on the River Lambourn. As a producing house, the theatre has produced works that have subsequently moved on to the West End, including the 2004 revival of Sweeney Todd: The Demon Barber of Fleet Street.

History 
The theatre is situated in Bagnor Mill, a former corn mill on the River Lambourn in Bagnor, Berkshire. It opened as a 113-seat amateur theatre in 1965, having been converted by David Gollins. In 1967 the theatre was expanded with the addition of a fly system and lighting control, and housed its first professional productions. In 1971, the auditorium was rebuilt to allow a capacity of 170.

In 1981 the theatre was purchased by Jill Fraser, who sought to change it from a local repertory theatre into a producing house. In the 1990s, the Propeller company was formed at the theatre. In the early 21st century, the theatre staged a number of productions that subsequently transferred to the West End – including Sweeney Todd: The Demon Barber of Fleet Street and The Gondoliers.

In the mid 2000s, Fraser sought to sell the theatre to ensure its long-term future. The "Save The Watermill" appeal was founded to raise funds to allow the board of trustees to purchase the theatre. Fraser died from cancer in February 2006. In 2008 it was announced that funds had been met for the theatre's purchase. Fraser was succeeded as artistic director by Hedda Beeby. Paul Hart, the incumbent artistic director, was appointed as Beeby's successor in 2015.

Productions 

In March 2020, the theatre produced the world premiere of The Wicker Husband. The musical closed on its press night due to the COVID-19 pandemic, and is due to return in March 2022.

The theatre ended 2021 with Tom Jackson Greaves's adaptation of The Jungle Book. WhatsOnStage described the use of they/them pronouns for Mowgli as "wonderfully inclusive", although a review in The Times said that "in its eagerness to put across its message of inclusivity the show is sometimes over-earnest".

References 

1967 establishments in England
Producing theatres in England
Theatres in Berkshire
West Berkshire District